Simas Jasaitis (born 26 March 1982) is a Lithuanian professional basketball player who last played for BC Dzūkija of the Lithuania Basketball League (LKL). He also represented the Lithuanian national basketball team.

Professional career
Jasaitis' first team in the LKL was Sakalai during the 2000-2001 season. In the fall of 2001 he moved to Lietuvos rytas, and played there till 2006. In his first season with the club he was averaging 8 points and 3.6 rebounds per game. Jasaitis returned to Lietuvos Rytas on 31 December 2010. In July 2011 he signed a one-year deal with Türk Telekom B.K. On January 5, 2015 he went back to Lietuvos rytas.

On July 5, 2016, he signed with Victoria Libertas Pesaro.

On July 28, 2017 Jasaitis signed with BC Lietkabelis. On September 12, 2020, he signed with BC Dzūkija.

Career statistics

EuroLeague

|-
| style="text-align:left;"| 2005–06
| style="text-align:left;"| Lietuvos rytas
| 20 || 19 || 29.2 || .580 || .396 || .741 || 5.0 || 1.0 || 1.5 || .2 || 10.7 || 10.9
|-
| style="text-align:left;"| 2006–07
| style="text-align:left;"| Maccabi Tel Aviv
| 23 || 19 || 25.0 || .661 || .400 || .816 || 3.5 || .5 || .6 || .1 || 9.9 || 9.2
|-
| style="text-align:left;"| 2007–08
| style="text-align:left;"| TAU Cerámica
| 21 || 5 || 14.3 || .519 || .500 || .833 || 1.4 || .2 || .2 || .0 || 4.6 || 3.3
|-
| style="text-align:left;"| 2008–09
| style="text-align:left;"| Joventut
| 10 || 7 || 21.3 || .581 || .342 || .818 || 2.8 || 1.0 || .8 || .2 || 9.3 || 9.2
|-
| style="text-align:left;"| 2010–11
| style="text-align:left;"| Lietuvos rytas
| 6 || 4 || 17.3 || .444 || .250 || .833 || 2.3 || 1.2 || .3 || .2 || 5.5 || 3.7
|-
| style="text-align:left;"| 2013–14
| style="text-align:left;"| Lokomotiv Kuban
| 23 || 14 || 21.3 || .585 || .353 || .1000 || 2.8 || .6 || .7 || .1 || 6.2 || 5.8

Awards and achievements

Pro clubs
 2× Lithuanian League Champion: (2002, 2006)
 2× ULEB Cup (EuroCup) Champion: (2005, 2013)
 2× Lithuanian All-Star: (2006, 2011)
 Lithuanian All-Star Game MVP: (2006)
 Baltic League Champion: (2006)
 Israeli League Champion: (2007)
 Spanish League Champion: (2008)

Lithuanian senior national team
 EuroBasket 2007: 
 2010 FIBA World Championship, Turkey:

References

External links

 Euroleague.net Profile

1982 births
Living people
Basketball players at the 2008 Summer Olympics
Basketball players at the 2012 Summer Olympics
BC Lietkabelis players
BC Rytas players
Galatasaray S.K. (men's basketball) players
Israeli Basketball Premier League players
Joventut Badalona players
Lega Basket Serie A players
Liga ACB players
Lithuanian expatriate basketball people in Italy
Lithuanian expatriate basketball people in Spain
Lithuanian men's basketball players
Maccabi Tel Aviv B.C. players
Olympic basketball players of Lithuania
Orlandina Basket players
PBC Lokomotiv-Kuban players
Saski Baskonia players
Small forwards
Basketball players from Vilnius
Türk Telekom B.K. players
Victoria Libertas Pallacanestro players
2014 FIBA Basketball World Cup players
2010 FIBA World Championship players
2006 FIBA World Championship players
Lithuanian expatriate basketball people in Israel
Lithuanian expatriate basketball people in Turkey
Lithuanian expatriate sportspeople in Russia
Lithuanian expatriate basketball people in Russia